Fin Nunatak is a nunatak,  high, in the middle of Casey Glacier, near the east coast of Palmer Land, Antarctica. The nunatak was photographed from the air by Sir Hubert Wilkins on 20 December 1928, and was first mapped from these photos by W.L.G. Joerg. It was surveyed by the Falkland Islands Dependencies Survey in December 1960. The name by the UK Antarctic Place-Names Committee is suggested by the fin-like shape of the feature.

References 

Nunataks of Palmer Land